Louise Broadfoot (born 26 February 1978 in Melbourne) is an Australian former cricket player.

Broadfoot played domestic cricket for the Victorian Spirit between 1996 and 2004 and the Queensland Fire between 2005 and 2010. She played 113 Women's National Cricket League matches and five Women's Twenty20 matches.

Broadfoot played two Tests and ten One Day Internationals for the Australia national women's cricket team. Broadfoot was the 137th woman to play Test Cricket for Australia, and the 92nd woman to play One Day International Cricket for Australia. Broadfoot also served in the Australian Army in Afghanistan.

Originally from Melbourne, her sister is Marianne Edwards (nee Broadfoot), associate principal second violin in the Sydney Symphony Orchestra  and her brother is barrister Andrew Broadfoot KC,  former Australian rowing representative  and part owner of 2015 Melbourne Cup winner Prince of Penzance.

References

Living people
Australia women Test cricketers
Australia women One Day International cricketers
1978 births
Sportswomen from Victoria (Australia)
Cricketers from Melbourne